Rose Simpson (born 22 November 1946) is an English former musician. Between 1968 and 1971, she was a member of the Incredible String Band, with whom she played bass guitar, violin, percussion and sang.  She later became Lady Mayoress of the Welsh town of Aberystwyth.

Biography
Simpson was born in Otley, Yorkshire. By the mid-1960s, she was studying at the University of York, where she was president of the mountaineering club.  She met Robin Williamson and Mike Heron in 1968 when the Incredible String Band were performing there, and travelled down to London with Williamson.

She soon began performing with the band. According to the band's producer Joe Boyd, "the day Robin proposed that Licorice join the group, Mike went out and bought Rose an electric bass. 'Learn this,' he said, 'you're in the group now, too.'" Later, Steve Winwood asked her to play bass on a track of his, but Boyd declined the invitation. "I wasn't a competent enough musician, and Joe knew it. Joe put him off, but I was grateful," she later said.   She also sang and played violin and percussion.  

She left the group in 1971, planning to take up sound engineering, but instead starting a family.   She later worked in various jobs, including the Probation Service.

In 1994, as the partner of a Liberal Democrat councillor who was the Mayor, she took on the largely honorary role of Lady Mayoress of Aberystwyth in Wales, an event which received wide publicity. During that period of her life, she lived in the Welsh village of Llanon, in a house on the main A487 coast road.

She gained a PhD degree in German Literature at the University of Aberystwyth, and has lectured there on the work of 1930s authors Ina Seidel and Vicki Baum. She was awarded the Postgraduate Teacher Award in 2014.

As of 2019, she lived in Totnes, Devon.   Her memoir of her time in the Incredible String Band was published in 2020.

References

External links
  2019 interview at PeterKurtz.com

Further reading
Simpson, Rose. Muse, Odalisque, Handmaiden. A Girl's Life in The Incredible String Band. Strange Attractor Press, London. 2020. ISBN 9781907222672.

Alumni of the University of York
Living people
People from Otley
The Incredible String Band members
1946 births
People from Aberystwyth